Jules Lefebvre (born 12 January 1996) is a Canadian snowboarder who competes internationally in the alpine snowboard discipline.

Career
Lefebvre has competed at one Senior World Championships in 2021. Lefebvre's best performances came in the parallel slalom event, 26th overall.

In January 2022, Lefebvre was initially not named to Canada's 2022 Olympic team. However, after an appeal process Lefebvre along with three other snowboarders were added to the team in the parallel giant slalom event.

References

External links
 

1996 births
Living people
Sportspeople from Montreal
Canadian male snowboarders
Snowboarders at the 2022 Winter Olympics
Olympic snowboarders of Canada
Competitors at the 2015 Winter Universiade